The Grand Rapids Public Museum, located on the bank of the Grand River in downtown Grand Rapids, Michigan, is among the oldest history museums in the United States. It was founded in 1854 as the "Grand Rapids Lyceum of Natural History". The museum includes a cafe, a gift shop, and a 1928 Spillman carousel, which is situated in a pavilion over the Grand River. A Wurlitzer #157 Band Organ that plays 165 rolls provides the carousel's music. The Museum building also houses the Roger B. Chaffee Planetarium. The current Pearl Street N.W. location, built in 1994, replaced the former Art Deco location on Jefferson Avenue S.E.; that building now serves as a high school and is connected to the GRPM Collections and the City of Grand Rapids Archives.

The GRPM brings in a variety of traveling exhibitions annually ranging among topics related to science, history and culture.

Core exhibits
Anishinabek: The People of This Place
The story of the Native American culture of West Michigan
The Streets of Old Grand Rapids
1890s-era three-quarters scale recreation of an allegorical Grand Rapids business district.
West Michigan Habitats
A look at both the ecosystems of Western Michigan along with the history of the museum as an interpreter of the natural world as well as a mounted skeleton of a Mastodon.
Collecting A through Z
This alphabet-linked exhibit provides a means to bring out artifacts from many of the museum's collections e.g.  "D is for Dolls"
Newcomers: The People of This Place
Showcases the variety of ethnic groups that have contributed their unique imprints to the greater Grand Rapids community.

Voigt House Victorian Museum

The museum also maintains the Voigt House Victorian Home, located at 115 College Ave. SE. The Voigt House (built in 1896 & last furnished in 1907) was the residence of the Carl Voigt family for over 76 years. Donated to the Grand Rapids Foundation upon the death of the youngest child Ralph Voigt in 1971, the property came into the eventual possession of the museum. The Voigt house is a time capsule to the late Victorian era, having never been remodeled by the family over the decades.

External links
Grand Rapids Public Museum
Voigt House Victorian Museum

Museums in Grand Rapids, Michigan
Education in Grand Rapids, Michigan
Natural history museums in Michigan
History museums in Michigan
Native American museums in Michigan
Museums established in 1854
1854 establishments in Michigan